Launch Complex 14 (LC-14) is a launch site at Cape Canaveral Space Force Station in Florida.  LC-14 was used for various crewed and uncrewed Atlas launches, including the February 1962, Friendship 7 flight aboard which John Glenn became the first American to orbit the Earth.

History

LC-14 was the first Atlas pad in operation and hosted the test flights in 1957–58. It was also the only one of the original four pads to never have a booster explode on it. By 1959, it was decided to convert the pad for the Atlas D missile and space launches, and a large service tower was added early in the year. The first Atlas flown from the renovated LC-14 was Missile 7D on May 18; however, a problem with the launcher hold-down arms damaged the missile and caused its explosion shortly after launch. This was traced to improper procedures during the renovation of the pad and was quickly fixed. The first space launch off of LC-14 was the Big Joe Mercury test in September. As the designated Mercury-Atlas facility, LC-14 was thus the only Atlas pad sporting the infrastructure needed for crewed launches. The first MIDAS satellites, one Atlas-Able launch, and a few more ICBM tests were conducted from LC-14 before it was completely turned over to NASA.

LC-14 is most well known as the launch site for NASA's Mercury-Atlas 6 flight, which made Glenn the first American in orbit. It was also the launch site of the remaining three Mercury-Atlas flights and various uncrewed Atlas launches. Later, it was the site for Atlas-Agena launches for the Agena Target Vehicles for Project Gemini.

Following decommissioning and abandonment as an active launch site, LC-14 slowly fell into decay. The proximity to the Atlantic Ocean created an ideal environment for corrosion of metal components, and the complex's red metal gantry structures were dismantled for safety reasons during the 1970s.

Restoration

In 1997, the 45th Space Wing embarked on a partial restoration of LC-14 under the aegis of the 45th Operations Support Squadron and its commander, Lt Col Dennis Hilley, USAF. Although extensive repairs were made by Boeing and Johnson Controls, with additional assistance from Lockheed Martin and Brown and Root, the restoration utilized no military construction or military operations and maintenance funding and was effected strictly with military, DoD civilian, NASA civilian, DoD contractor and NASA contractor volunteers.  Several months later, the exterior and interior of the original blockhouse and its nearby astronaut parking area had been restored, with the blockhouse converted into a conference facility for military, NASA and contractor use.

Present at the dedication in May 1998 were former Mercury astronauts Colonel Gordon Cooper, USAF (Ret.) and Commander Scott Carpenter, USN (Ret.); Mrs. Betty Grissom, widow of Lt Col Gus Grissom, USAF; and comedian Bill Dana, known for his "José Jiménez, the reluctant astronaut" character.  Appearing periodically on The Ed Sullivan Show in the 1960s, the character caught on as a subject of humor among the seven Mercury astronauts. 

Among other Mercury astronauts, former U.S. Senator (and Colonel, USMC (Ret.)) John Glenn could not attend due to preparations for his then-pending Space Shuttle flight (STS-95), and Captain Wally Schirra, USN (Ret.) could not attend due to a scheduling conflict. Deke Slayton had died in 1993, while Rear Admiral Alan Shepard, USN (Ret.) extended his regrets due to illness.  Largely unknown at the time was that Shepard was suffering from terminal leukemia, and he died shortly after the dedication.

In addition to the total interior renovation, the blockhouse contains historical documents, photos and memorabilia from Project Mercury, as well as photos of the blockhouse area before, during and after the restoration. Future improvements to the pad itself are also planned as time and contributory funding permits.

The entrance road to LC-14 is marked by several memorials and signs commemorating Project Mercury and the four of six crewed Mercury missions launched there. This includes a large sculpture of the Project Mercury symbol constructed of titanium, under which is buried a time capsule containing technical documents of the Mercury program. The time capsule is scheduled to be opened in 2464, 500 years after the official conclusion of the program.  With its withdrawal from operational status, a memorial marker in granite was also placed at the beginning of the concrete ramp that leads to LC-14's launch pad and two outdoor kiosks were erected to contain historical photos.

On March 7, 2023, Stoke Space was allocated the launch complex for their upcoming fully reusable launch vehicle.

Gallery

See also 
Gagarin's Start, the Soviet/Russian equivalent launch site, still in use in the 21st century
T. J. O'Malley

References

External links
 NASA-Spaceport News: Kennedy Space Center

Cape Canaveral Space Force Station
Project Mercury
Launch complexes of the United States Space Force